Googe is a surname. People with this name include:

Barnabe Googe (1540–1594), poet
Debbie Googe (born 1962),  bassist